The Appleton Transit Center is a bus terminus in downtown Appleton, Wisconsin, located at 100 East Washington Street (on the corner of Washington Street and Oneida Street).

History 
The transit centre had been hoped to have been completed by fall 1986. On 1 August 1986 the Appleton mayor proposed a design with a rooftop parking lot. The current standalone building was first proposed in April 1989 as a cheaper alternative to plans to renovate and use an existing building. The design included a convenience store, the attendant from which would be responsible for securing the building. This would reduce staffing costs for Valley Transit.

Construction on the center by Valley Transit began on September 12, 1989, and service began on March 1, 1990. 80% of the construction cost was funded by the Urban Mass Transportation Administration.  It was the first transit center built in Appleton.

The transit center is planned to be replaced in the mid-2020s with a new facility, which would also contain a mixed-use development, similar to Grand River Station in La Crosse.

Facilities 
It has climate-controlled waiting rooms, public washrooms, a payphone with free direct line telephones to Valley Transit, and vending machines. The north side of the building is the location of the Greyhound Lines office. Additional benches are outside, where there are designated bus boarding bays in a traffic-free transfer area. The entire grounds are non-smoking.

Service
The Appleton Transit Center is the center of the Valley Transit system, as most bus routes terminate there. The northwest corner of the property was formerly the boarding place for Greyhound buses, travelling between Green Bay, Wisconsin, and Milwaukee, Wisconsin. This service was withdrawn in 2018. The center also sees service from Lamers Bus Lines. Through ticketing is available from Amtrak; the Amtrak station code for the center is APP.

2019 shooting incident
On May 15, 2019, the Appleton Police and Fire Departments and Gold Cross Ambulance were called to the Transit Center shortly after 5:30 pm for a medical call. After initial treatment, the patient, identified as 47-year-old Ruben Houston, showed a handgun to the response team and began walking towards the Appleton Public Library before firing rounds from the gun, killing firefighter Mitchell F. Lundgaard and injuring a police officer and a bystander.

See also
 Valley Transit
 List of intercity bus stops in Wisconsin

References

External links
Official page
Amtrak's page

Buildings and structures in Appleton, Wisconsin
Bus stations in Wisconsin
Transit centers in the United States
Amtrak Thruway Motorcoach stations in Wisconsin